WPTP-LP (104.3 FM) was a radio station based in Marble, North Carolina, a small community in the western part of the state in Cherokee County, between Murphy and Andrews. The station was owned by the Emmanuel Baptist Church.

WPTP broadcast Old Time Gospel Music and Christian-related programming 24 hours a day, such as Harvest Time Radio Broadcast with Dr. Stinnett Ballew, and Looking unto Jesus with Dr. Clarence Sexton. You could hear WPTP by logging on to WPTP.org on the World Wide Web.

History
WPTP began broadcasting on April 19, 2005 with 100 watts. In the beginning, the radio station was totally automated. The music and announcers were loaded on a computer using an automation program. For the first two-and-a-half years, the station broadcast on FM 95.1.

On December 2, 2011, the FCC cancelled the station's license and deleted the WPTP-LP call sign from its database.

References

External links
 

PTP-LP
PTP-LP
Radio stations established in 2005
Defunct radio stations in the United States
Radio stations disestablished in 2011
2005 establishments in North Carolina
2011 disestablishments in North Carolina
Defunct religious radio stations in the United States
PTP-LP